Fuad I ( Fu’ād al-Awwal;  or ; 26 March 1868 – 28 April 1936) was the Sultan and later King of Egypt and the Sudan. The ninth ruler of Egypt and Sudan from the Muhammad Ali dynasty, he became Sultan in 1917, succeeding his elder brother Hussein Kamel. He replaced the title of Sultan with King when the United Kingdom unilaterally declared Egyptian independence in 1922.

Early life
Fuad was born in Giza Palace in Cairo, the fifth issue of Isma'il Pasha. He spent his childhood with his exiled father in Naples. He got his education from the military academy in Turin, Italy. His mother was Ferial Qadin.

Prior to becoming sultan, Fuad had played a major role in the establishment of Egyptian University. He became the university's first rector in 1908, and remained in the post until his resignation in 1913. He was succeeded as rector by then-minister of Justice Hussein Rushdi Pasha. In 1913, Fuad made unsuccessful attempts to secure the throne of Albania for himself, which had obtained its independence from the Ottoman Empire a year earlier. At the time, Egypt and Sudan was ruled by his nephew, Abbas II, and the likelihood of Fuad becoming the monarch in his own country seemed remote. This, and the fact that the Muhammad Ali dynasty was of Albanian descent, encouraged Fuad to seek the Albanian throne. Fuad also served as president of the Egyptian Geographic Society from 1915 until 1918.

Reign

Fuad came under consideration as a candidate for the Albanian throne, but he was ultimately bypassed in favour of a Christian ruler. He ascended the throne of the Sultanate of Egypt upon the death of his brother Hussein Kamel in 1917. In the aftermath of the Egyptian Revolution of 1919, the United Kingdom ended its protectorate over Egypt, and recognised it as a sovereign state on 28 February 1922. On 15 March 1922, Fuad issued a decree changing his title from Sultan of Egypt to King of Egypt. In 1930, he attempted to strengthen the power of the Crown by abrogating the 1923 Constitution and replacing it with a new constitution that limited the role of parliament to advisory status only. Large scale public dissatisfaction compelled him to restore the earlier constitution in 1935.

The 1923 Constitution granted Fuad vast powers. He made frequent use of his right to dissolve Parliament. During his reign, cabinets were dismissed at royal will, and parliaments never lasted for their full four-year term but were dissolved by decree.

Creation of the Royal Archives
Fuad was an instrumental force in modern Egyptian historiography. He employed numerous archivists to copy, translate, and arrange eighty-seven volumes of correspondence related to his paternal ancestors from European archives, and later to collect old documents from Egyptian archives into what became the Royal Archives in the 1930s. Fuad's efforts to portray his ancestors – especially his great-grandfather Muhammad Ali, his grandfather Ibrahim, and his father – as nationalists and benevolent monarchs would prove to be an enduring influence on Egyptian historiography.

Personal life
Fuad married his first wife in Cairo, on 30 May 1895 (nikah), and at the Abbasiya Palace in Cairo, on 14 February 1896 (zifaf), Princess Shivakiar Khanum Effendi (1876–1947). She was his first cousin once removed and the only daughter of Field Marshal Prince Ibrahim Fahmi Ahmad Pasha (his first cousin) by his first wife, Vijdan Navjuvan Khanum. They had two children, a son, Ismail Fuad, who died in infancy, and a daughter, Fawkia. Unhappily married, the couple divorced in 1898. During a dispute with the brother of his first wife, Prince Ahmad Saif-uddin Ibrahim Bey, Fuad was shot in the throat. He survived, but carried that scar the rest of his life.

Fuad married his second wife at the Bustan Palace in Cairo on 24 May 1919. She was Nazli Sabri (1894–1978), daughter of Abdu'r-Rahim Pasha Sabri, sometime Minister of Agriculture and Governor of Cairo, by his wife, Tawfika Khanum Sharif. Queen Nazli also was a maternal granddaughter of Major-General Muhammad Sharif Pasha, sometime Prime Minister and Minister for Foreign Affairs, and a great-granddaughter of Suleiman Pasha, a French officer in Napoleon's army who converted to Islam and reorganized the Egyptian army. The couple had five children, the future King Farouk, and four daughters, the Princesses Fawzia (who became Queen Consort of Iran), Faiza, Faika, and Fathia.

As with his first wife, Fuad's relation with his second wife was also stormy. The couple continually fought, Fuad even forbidding Nazli from leaving the palace. When Fuad died, it was said that the triumphant Nazli sold all of his clothes to a local used-clothes market in revenge. Fuad died at the Koubbeh Palace in Cairo and was buried at the Khedival Mausoleum in the ar-Rifai Mosque in Cairo.

King Fuad's wife lived as a widow after his death. She did not have good relations with her son. After Fuad's death, she left Egypt and went to the United States. She converted to Catholicism in 1950 and changed her name to Mary Elizabeth. She got deprived of her rights and titles in Egypt. Once named the world's richest and most elegant woman, she possessed one of the largest jewellery collections in the world.

China
The Fuad (Fū’ād) (فؤاد الأول) Muslim Library in China was named after him by the Chinese Muslim Ma Songting. Muḥammad 'Ibrāhīm Fulayfil (محمد إبراهيم فليفل) and Muḥammad ad-Dālī (محمد الدالي) were ordered to Beijing by the King.

Titles
26 March 1868 – 9 October 1917: His Highness Ahmed Fuad Pasha
9 October 1917 – 15 March 1922: His Highness The Sultan of Egypt and Sudan, Sovereign of Nubia, Kordofan and Darfur
15 March 1922 – 28 April 1936: His Majesty The King of Egypt and Sudan, Sovereign of Nubia, Kordofan and Darfur

Honours
Domestic
 Founder and Sovereign of the Order of Agriculture
 Founder and Sovereign of the Order of Culture
 Founder and Sovereign of the Order of Commerce and Industry

Foreign
 Ottoman Empire: Order of the Medjidie, 1st Class, 1893
 Kingdom of Italy: Grand Cross of the Order of Saints Maurice and Lazarus, 1911
 Greece: Grand Cross of the Order of the Redeemer, 1912
 United Kingdom of Great Britain and Ireland: Knight Grand Cross of the Order of the Bath (GCB), 1917
 Qajar Iran: Imperial Order of Persia, 1919
 Portugal: Grand Cross of the Order of the Tower and Sword, 1920
 Sweden: Commander Grand Cross of the Order of Vasa, 1921
 Kingdom of Romania: Grand Cross w/Collar of the Order of Carol I, 1921
 Empire of Japan: Collar of the Order of the Chrysanthemum, 1921
 Kingdom of Italy: Knight of the Order of the Most Holy Annunciation, 1922
 Spain: Collar of the Order of Charles III, 1922
 Kingdom of Hejaz: Grand Cordon of the Order of the Renaissance of the Hejaz, 1922
 Netherlands: Knight Grand Cross of the Order of the Netherlands Lion, 1925
 Kingdom of Afghanistan: Grand Collar of the Order of the Supreme Sun, 1927
 Albanian Kingdom: Grand Collar of the Kingdom of Albania, 1927
 United Kingdom: Royal Victorian Chain (RVC), 1927
 French Third Republic: Grand Cross of the Legion of Honour, 1927
 Belgium: Grand Cordon of the Order of Leopold, 1927
 Syria: Grand Cordon of the Order of the Umayyads, 1927
 Czechoslovakia: Collar of the Order of the White Lion, 1927
 Poland: Grand Cross of the Order of the White Eagle, 1932
 Sweden: Knight of the Royal Order of the Seraphim, 1933
 Thailand: Knight of the Order of the Royal House of Chakri, 1934
 Denmark: Knight of the Order of the Elephant, 1932
 Finland: Grand Cross of the Order of the White Rose of Finland, 1935
 Iran: Grand Collar of the Order of the Crown, 1935

See also

Kingdom of Egypt
List of monarchs of the Muhammad Ali dynasty

References
General

Specific

External links
 

1868 births
1936 deaths
Egyptian Muslims
20th-century Egyptian monarchs
Muhammad Ali dynasty
Kings of Egypt
Kings of Sudan
Sultans of Egypt
Field marshals of Egypt
Knights Grand Cross of the Order of Saints Maurice and Lazarus
Grand Crosses of the Order of Vasa
Grand Croix of the Légion d'honneur
Honorary Knights Grand Cross of the Order of the Bath
Egyptian people of Albanian descent
Egyptian people of Circassian descent
Recipients of the Order of the White Eagle (Poland)